Eszter Csákányi (born June 10, 1953 in Budapest) is a Hungarian actress.  She appeared in 1991's Paths of Death and Angels. She is the daughter of actor László Csákányi.

References

1953 births
Living people
Hungarian film actresses
Hungarian Jews
Actresses from Budapest